Finland competed at the 1972 Summer Olympics in Munich, West Germany. 96 competitors, 89 men and 7 women, took part in 75 events in 16 sports.

Medalists
Finland finished in 14th position in the final medal rankings, with three gold medals and eight medals overall.

Gold
 Pekka Vasala — Athletics, Men's 1,500m 
 Lasse Virén — Athletics, Men's 5,000m 
 Lasse Virén — Athletics, Men's 10,000m

Silver
 Reima Virtanen — Boxing, Men's Middleweight

Bronze
 Tapio Kantanen — Athletics, Men's 3,000m Steeplechase
 Kyösti Laasonen — Archery, Men's Individual Competition
 Risto Hurme, Veikko Salminen, and Martti Ketelä — Modern Pentathlon, Men's Team Competition
 Risto Björlin — Wrestling, Men's Greco-Roman Bantamweight

Archery

In the first modern archery competition at the Olympics, Finland entered three men. They won a bronze medal.

Men's Individual Competition:
 Kyösti Laasonen — 2467 points (→ Bronze Medal)
 Olavi Laurila — 2372 points (→ 20th place)
 Jorma Sandelin — 2278 points (→ 40th place)

Athletics

Men's 100 metres
Antti Rajamäki
 First Heat — 10.52s (→ did not advance)
Raimo Vilen
 First Heat — 11.00s (→ did not advance)

Men's 1500 metres
Pekka Vasala
 Heat — 3:40.9
 Semifinals — 3:37.9
 Final — 3:36.3 (→  Gold Medal)
Pekka Päivärinta
 Heat — 3:40.9
 Semifinals — 3:45.1 (→ did not advance)

Men's 5000 metres
Tapio Kantanen
 Heat — 13:42.0 (→ did not advance)

Men's 4 × 100 m Relay
Antti Rajamäki, Raimo Vilen, Erik Gustafsson, and Markku Juhola
 Heat — 39.54s 
 Semifinals — 39.30s (NR) (→ did not advance)

Boxing

Men's Light Middleweight (– 71 kg)
Mikko Saarinen
 First Round — Bye 
 Second Round — Defeated David Attan (KEN), TKO-2 
 Third Round — Lost to Peter Tiepold (GDR), 0:5

Canoeing

Cycling

Six cyclists represented Finland in 1972.

Individual road race
 Harry Hannus — did not finish (→ no ranking)
 Mauno Uusivirta — did not finish (→ no ranking)
 Tapani Vuorenhela — did not finish (→ no ranking)
 Ole Wackström — did not finish (→ no ranking)

Team time trial
 Kalevi Eskelinen
 Harry Hannus
 Mauno Uusivirta
 Ole Wackström

Team individual pursuit
 Raimo Suikkanen

Diving

Men's 3m Springboard:
 Pentti Koskinen — 336.99 points (15th place)

Women's 3m Springboard:
 Laura Kivelä — 236.25 points (24th place)

Women's 10m Platform:
 Laura Kivelä — 172.65 points (22nd place)

Fencing

One fencer represented Finland in 1972.

Men's épée
 Risto Hurme

Gymnastics

Judo

Modern pentathlon

Three male pentathletes represented Finland in 1972, with them winning bronze in the team event.

Men's Individual Competition:
 Risto Hurme — 5094 points (→ 8th place)
 Veikko Salminen — 4852 points (→ 17th place)
 Martti Ketelä — 4849 points (→ 19th place)

Men's Team Competition:
 Hurme, Salminen, and Ketelä — 14812 points (→  Bronze Medal)

Rowing

Men's Coxed Pairs
Leo Ahonen, Leif Anderson and Antero Yli-lkkelä
Heat — 8:06.56
Repechage — 8:11.89 (→ did not advance)

Sailing

Shooting

Ten male shooters represented Finland in 1972.

25 m pistol
 Immo Huhtinen
 Seppo Mäkinen

50 m pistol
 Seppo Irjala
 Immo Huhtinen

300 m rifle, three positions
 Jaakko Minkkinen
 Osmo Ala-Honkola

50 m rifle, three positions
 Esa Kervinen
 Jaakko Minkkinen

50 m rifle, prone
 Jaakko Asikainen
 Esa Kervinen

50 m running target
 Pekka Suomela
 Paavo Mikkonen

Skeet
 Ari Westergård

Swimming

Weightlifting

Wrestling

References

Nations at the 1972 Summer Olympics
1972 Summer Olympics
S